Boumia is a town in north-eastern Algeria.

Communes of Batna Province
Batna Province